The 2023 Categoría Primera A season (officially known as the 2023 Liga BetPlay Dimayor season for sponsorship purposes) is the 76th season of the Categoría Primera A, Colombia's top-flight football league. The season began on 24 January and will end on 10 December 2023.

Deportivo Pereira are the defending champions, having won the 2022 Finalización tournament.

Format
The competition format for this season was approved by the Extraordinary Assembly of DIMAYOR on 14 December 2022, which decided to keep the same system used in the previous season, with two tournaments (Apertura and Finalización) of three stages each.

Teams

20 teams will take part in the season, the top 18 teams from the relegation table of the previous season as well as the 2022 Primera B champions Boyacá Chicó and the winners of the Primera B promotion play-off Atlético Huila. Boyacá Chicó were the first team to earn promotion, winning the Primera B title on 21 November 2022 after beating Atlético Huila in the season's Grand Final, while Atlético Huila themselves ensured promotion to the top flight on 29 November 2022, after winning the promotion play-off against Deportes Quindío. The promoted teams replaced Patriotas and Cortuluá, the bottom two teams in the relegation table of the 2022 season, who were relegated to Primera B.

Stadia and locations

Personnel and kits

Managerial changes

Notes

Torneo Apertura
The Torneo Apertura (officially known as Liga BetPlay Dimayor 2023–I) is the first tournament of the 2023 season. It began on 24 January and will end on 25 June 2023.

First stage

Standings

Results

Top scorers

{| class="wikitable" border="1"
|-
! Rank
! Name
! Club
! Goals
|-
| rowspan=4 align=center | 1
| Gonzalo Lencina
|Atlético Bucaramanga
| rowspan=4 align=center | 4
|-
| Edwar López
|Deportivo Pasto
|-
| Marco Pérez
|Águilas Doradas
|-
| Facundo Suárez
|América de Cali
|-
| rowspan=8 align=center | 5
| Geimer Balanta
|Boyacá Chicó
| rowspan=8 align=center | 3
|-
| Omar Duarte
|Jaguares
|-
| Marcus Vinicius
|Atlético Huila
|-
| Dayro Moreno
|Once Caldas
|-
| Henry Mosquera
|Envigado
|-
| Henry Plazas
|Boyacá Chicó
|-
| Arley Rodríguez
|Deportivo Pereira
|-
| Pablo Rojas
|Jaguares
|}

Source: Soccerway

Relegation
A separate table is kept to determine the teams that are relegated to the Categoría Primera B for the next season. This table is elaborated from a sum of all first stage games played in the three most recent seasons (including the 2021–I, 2021–II, 2022–I, 2022–II, 2023–I, and 2023–II tournaments), with the points earned being averaged per match played. The bottom two teams of the relegation table at the end of the season will be relegated to Categoría Primera B.

Source: Dimayor Rules for classification: 1) average, 2) 2023 points, 3) 2023 goal difference, 4) 2023 goals scored, 5) 2023 away goals scored, 6) 2023 away goals against, 7) 2023 wins, 8) 2023 yellow cards, 9) 2023 red cards, 10) drawing of lots.

See also
 2023 Categoría Primera B season
 2023 Copa Colombia

References

External links
 Dimayor's official website 

Categoría Primera A seasons
1
Colombia
Colombia